After business magnate Elon Musk completed his acquisition of American social media company Twitter Inc. in October 2022, the company has introduced a series of reforms and reduced its workforce.

Background

Developments

Initial reforms 
On October 27, 2022, Musk announced that a "content moderation council" with diversified viewpoints would be established to inform the platform's content policy, and declared a moratorium in "major content decisions or account reinstatements" until then. The council was never formed, with Musk claiming that it was part of a deal he made with activists which they allegedly dishonored. He also signaled his intention to do away with lifetime account suspensions and unban those suspended for "minor [or] dubious reasons". On October 30, technology newsletter Platformer reported that Twitter would require users to purchase a Twitter Blue subscription in order to retain their blue checkmarks indicating they were "verified" on the platform, which was later confirmed by Musk as a measure to combat spambot accounts. The feature began rolling out on November 5, but was then delayed until after the U.S. midterm elections due to concerns of potential election interference. Twitter's trust and safety team assessed the potential for impersonation of official accounts and increasing the credibility of scammers with their highest risk categorization. Musk ordered Twitter employees to revamp multiple aspects of the program by the end of the week, enlisting employees from his other companies such as Tesla Inc., the Boring Company, and Neuralink, as well as investors Jason Calacanis and Sriram Krishnan. To meet these deadlines, many Twitter staff members were directed to extend their working hours. Musk later stated that he would not alter Twitter's content policies or restore banned accounts until after the midterms.

On November 9, one day after Election Day, Twitter launched its revamped verification program on iOS devices, with all users now able to obtain a blue checkmark by purchasing Twitter Blue. To distinguish between those who had been verified before the change and those who received the checkmark via Twitter Blue, secondary gray checkmarks labeled "official" were briefly added to the former's profiles before Musk overruled the feature hours later. Instead, a pop-up message indicating which of the two groups a verified user belonged to was also added to the blue checkmark. The gray checkmarks were inexplicably restored the next day, and then Twitter halted new verifications via Twitter Blue amid a spike in impersonator accounts. The program relaunched on December 12, with Musk introducing gold checkmarks for businesses and gray checkmarks for government accounts. Musk also met with advertisers via Twitter Spaces to outline his plans to fulfill his pre-acquisition pledges, previewing forthcoming features and allaying fears of a rise in disinformation and hate speech. He also named Community Notes, a fact-checking tool formerly known as Birdwatch, as a prospective substitute for Twitter's current approaches to content moderation.

Layoffs and mass resignations 
On November 4, 2022, Musk and Twitter began laying off a substantial portion of the company's workforce and Twitter temporarily closed its offices, with The New York Times estimating that roughly half of employees had been let go. The night before the layoffs, five Twitter employees based in San Francisco and Cambridge, Massachusetts, filed a lawsuit against the company, alleging that mass layoffs would violate federal and California WARN Acts. Musk explained that the layoffs were a cost-cutting measure and stated that the company had been losing over $4 million a day, criticizing activist groups who had called on advertisers to cease doing business with the company. The Times described the layoffs as "haphazard", with employees learning of their firings through a variety of means. Workers in Dublin and Tokyo received emails regarding the layoffs, while those in Ireland and Britain remained in their offices at night to await official word on their employment status. Others learned that they had been laid off when they found themselves locked out of their work applications. Twitter's internal directory, Birdhouse, was taken offline and Twitter offices worldwide were closed for the weekend. On November 6, Twitter asked some employees who had been laid off to return to the company, either because they had been fired by mistake or because they were belatedly deemed important to the health of the business.

Days after the layoffs, Twitter terminated a large number of its contractors, and Musk fired a series of employees who criticized him publicly or within the company. On November 16, Musk delivered an ultimatum to employees via email: commit to "extremely hardcore" work in order to realize Musk's vision of "Twitter 2.0", or leave. In response, hundreds of Twitter employees resigned the next day, hours before the deadline to respond to Musk's email, rendering many of Twitter's core functions nonviable. Business Insider reported that less than 2000 employees remained at the company. Musk and his advisers met with several employees to dissuade them from leaving the company, while Twitter offices were once again closed until November 21. Despite the closures, Musk summoned all Twitter software engineers to Twitter's headquarters on November 18, seeking greater insight into the platform's solution stack. Additional layoffs occurred later that month, and the company resumed hiring. Musk continued laying off employees in February 2023, promising substantial "performance-based stock awards" to employees who remained at the company.

In March 7th, 2023, Elon Musk was involved in a spat on Twitter with an employee named Haraldur Thorleifsson. Thorleifsson joined Twitter after the company purchased his start-up, Ueno, in 2021 agreeing to take the buy-out payment in wages as opposed to a lump sum. Thorleifsson sent out a tweet seeking to clarify whether of not he had been laid off by Twitter after he was unable to log in. In response Musk commented on Thorleifsson's disability, he has muscular dystrophy, and that he did no actual work. Musk would later apologize to Thorleifsson via Twitter stating that he was misinformed and that while Thorleifsson had been terminated he was considering remaining at Twitter.

Content moderation 

Musk began unbanning banned accounts in late November 2022, beginning with Jordan Peterson, Kathy Griffin, The Babylon Bee, and Donald Trump. Multiple anti-fascist accounts were suspended, many of which had been named by far-right figures who urged Musk to take action. Among those banned include a group that provides security to LGBTQ+ events and several accounts parodying Musk. Twitter also announced it would no longer enforce its policy prohibiting COVID-19 misinformation, and dissolved its Trust and Safety Council responsible for Twitter's policies on hate speech, child sexual exploitation, and self-harm content. After previously indicating his intention to review Twitter's policy against "misgendering or deadnaming of transgender individuals", Musk relaxed the platform's hate speech policies, with Gizmodo describing the policy protecting transgender people as "effectively dead".

On December 14, Musk suspended ElonJet, a Twitter bot account operated by Jack Sweeney which tracked Musk's private jet in real-time using publicly accessible data, in addition to several of Sweeney's other accounts. He had previously stated, "My commitment to free speech extends even to not banning the account following my plane, even though that is a direct personal safety risk." Defending his decision to suspend the accounts, Musk declared a ban on doxxing real-time location data, and Twitter followed suit by updating its policies page. The next day, Twitter banned the accounts of multiple journalists who had been covering the ElonJet incident, as well as the Mastodon account on Twitter, on the grounds that they had violated the new doxxing policy. Some of the suspended journalists joined a Twitter Spaces mass audio call with Musk, where Musk was asked about the their suspensions; Musk quit the call, and the call was abruptly ended before the entire Twitter Spaces service was temporarily taken down. Musk attributed the shutdown to a software bug, while a Twitter senior software engineer acknowledged that Spaces had been "taken offline". Most suspended journalists were later reinstated, but found themselves unable to post new tweets until their policy-violating tweets had been taken down.

In November, Twitter analytics firm Bot Sentinel calculated that around 877,000 accounts were deactivated and 497,000 were suspended between October 27 and November 1, over double the usual number. By December 17, Twitter was blocking some links to Mastodon as being "potentially harmful" or "malware". On December 18, Twitter announced a new policy barring users from promoting certain social media platforms, including Mastodon, but rescinded it within a day following significant backlash. Musk apologized and pledged to poll Twitter users before enacting "major policy changes" going forward. Twitter adopted an updated zero-tolerance policy on "violent speech" on February 28, 2023, described by The Verge as both "more specific  more vague" than the prior version.

Resignation poll 

On November 16, 2022, Musk stated that he planned to eventually appoint a new CEO to oversee Twitter, shortly thereafter beginning the process of searching for his successor. On December 18, amid growing public discontent surrounding the ElonJet and Mastodon controversies, Musk conducted an open-access Twitter poll asking whether he should resign from his position as Twitter CEO, claiming that he would "abide by the results". The poll resolved to "yes" after 57.5 percent of 17.5 million users voted in favor of him stepping down.

After this result, Musk responded "interesting" to unfounded theories that the result of the resignation poll had been influenced by bots, agreeing with a user's suggestion to restrict future polls on policy changes to paid Twitter Blue subscribers. On December 20, he announced he would step down as CEO as soon as his replacement was selected, but would continue to lead Twitter's software and server teams. He later stated that a new CEO would be appointed by the end of 2023.

API changes 
On January 12, 2023, Twitter abruptly cut off many 3rd-party Twitter clients' application programming interface (API) access, causing them to stop functioning. This change remained uncommented until a week later, when the company cited unspecified "long-standing API rules" as the reason for the change. By January 19, Twitter had retroactively updated its developer agreement barring developers from creating products similar to Twitter's own app, On February 2, Twitter announced it would be removing the free tier of its API by February 9 and replace it with a "basic paid tier". Musk later stated that bot accounts that provided "good content" would be permitted to continue using Twitter's API.

Engagement with Musk's tweets 
On February 1, 2023, Musk temporarily made his Twitter account "private" as an experiment to test his tweets' engagement level. When the experiment failed to deliver promising results, Musk summoned a group of engineers and demanded an explanation for his declining reach. A principal engineer suggested that this was due to "easily chartable waning public interest in Musk", prompting Musk to fire them. On February 13, Musk expressed concern over the fact that his tweet about Super Bowl LVII had garnered fewer impressions than U.S. President Joe Biden's. Summoning another meeting with engineers, Musk ordered an 80-person team to address the perceived issue, under penalty of being fired. As a result, engineers altered Twitter's algorithm to boost Musk's tweets by a factor of 1000, causing his tweets to inundate many users' "For You" feeds.

Reactions 

Author Stephen King, Democrat Alexandria Ocasio-Cortez, and Democrat Ed Markey criticized Musk's decision to charge Twitter users for the blue checkmark. Tweeting in support of Ocasio-Cortez, actor Mark Ruffalo called on Musk to give up ownership of Twitter. Social media platform Tumblr mocked the revamped verification program by selling a pair of functionless blue checkmarks parodying that of Twitter's. Biden expressed concern with Musk's plans for Twitter, saying that it "spews lies all across the world". After the layoffs, employees flooded the anonymous forum service Blind with negative comments about Musk, with Dorsey expressing gratitude toward laid-off employees and apologizing for growing the company too rapidly. The FTC commented that it was closely monitoring developments at Twitter, stressing that Musk must abide by its consent decrees, while EU Data Protection Commissioner Helen Dixon stated that her office had reached out to Twitter to discuss privacy concerns.

On November 9, 2022, Biden expressed support for a U.S. government review of the foreign investors backing Musk's purchase, alluding to national security concerns. However, U.S. Treasury Secretary Janet Yellen stated that she did not see a reason to investigate the acquisition and unaware of any national security concerns. Seven Democratic senators urged the FTC to investigate Musk's rapid changes to Twitter, while pharmaceutical company Eli Lilly suspended all advertising campaigns on Twitter after a false tweet from an impersonator account went viral. Former head of consumer product Jeff Seibert expressed disappointment and frustration over Musk's changes to Twitter. In the wake of mass employee resignations on November 17, many Twitter users posted humorous messages on the platform expressing grief and anticipating a possible shutdown of Twitter, with some posting links to their other social media accounts.

Musk's suspension of journalists covering the ElonJet incident was widely condemned. CNN and The Washington Post, whose reporters were banned, criticized Musk's hypocrisy and impulsiveness, while Digital Content Next CEO Jason Kint demanded Musk explain his actions. Democrats Lori Trahan, Yvette Clarke, Ro Khanna, Ritchie Torres, and Martin Heinrich all criticized Musk, while Democrat Don Beyer also voiced disapproval with Musk's labeling of Mastodon links as malicious. Lawmakers from the EU, France, and Germany sided with the journalists and threatened to take retaliatory action against Musk.

Critical commentary 
The first weeks of Musk's tenure at Twitter have been widely described as chaotic and tumultuous by the media. Harvard professor Sandra Sucher called Musk's mass layoffs "poorly handled". Gerald Hathaway of the Faegre Drinker Biddle & Reath law firm argued the opposite, believing that Musk had done what was necessary to curb Twitter's losses, assuming his claims about Twitter's losses were true. Jason Wilson of the Southern Poverty Law Center criticized Musk's perceived disinterest in "policing hate speech", observing an increase in verified white nationalists and other far-right extremists. Branko Marcetic of Jacobin accused Twitter of bias after several left-wing accounts were suspended. Experts with the Brookings Institution noted that the importance of Twitter "as a platform for political discourse in the U.S." raised implications for national security, while cybersecurity expert Peter W. Singer detailed multiple cybersecurity concerns stemming from Musk's acquisition.

References

Further reading 

 

2022 in economics
2022 controversies
Elon Musk
October 2022 events in the United States
Twitter, Inc.